Trönninge BK is a Swedish football club located in Varberg.

Background
Trönninge BK currently plays in Division 4 Halland Elit which is the sixth tier of Swedish football. They play their home matches at the Håstens IP in Varberg.

The club is affiliated to Hallands Fotbollförbund.

Season to season

Footnotes

External links
 Trönninge BK – Official website

Football clubs in Halland County
1967 establishments in Sweden